John Anstis (29 August 1669 – 4 March 1744) was an English officer of arms, antiquarian and politician who sat in the House of Commons between 1702 and 1722. He rose to the highest heraldic office in England and became Garter King of Arms in 1718 after years of political manoeuvring.

Early life
Anstis was born at St Neot, Cornwall on 29 August 1669. He was the first son of another John Anstis and his wife Mary, the daughter of George Smith. Anstis matriculated at Exeter College, Oxford, on 27 March 1685 and entered the Middle Temple on 31 January 1690. On 23 June 1695 he married Elizabeth, daughter and heir of Richard Cudlipp of Tavistock, Devon. They had eight sons and six daughters. Anstis was called to the bar on 19 May 1699.

Political life
In March 1701, Anstis received permission from the Earl Marshal, Henry Howard, 7th Duke of Norfolk, to collect materials from the College of Arms library to assist in the defence of the jurisdiction of the Earl Marshal, which was under attack. Anstis was also elected to Parliament for St Germans in 1702. When the Garter King of Arms, Sir Thomas St George, died in March 1703 Anstis was in a position to advise Lady Howard on how to protect her son's rights from the threat of a royal nomination of a new Garter on the one hand and the assumption of the nomination by the deputy earl marshal. Sir Henry St George was nominated to be Garter and succeeded his brother in June 1703.

Heraldic career
Anstis did not stand for election to Parliament in 1705. In May 1707 he was nominated Carlisle Herald of Arms Extraordinary and Norfolk Herald, as part of a plan to persuade Garter St George to administer the office jointly, with Anstis doing most of the work. In spite of the nomination, Anstis was never appointed to either post. His main rival to succeed St George was now John Vanbrugh, who had become Clarenceux King of Arms in March 1704 to strengthen his own claims to the office.

In December 1710 Anstis used a change in administration to try again at securing the Gartership. On 20 January 1711 he was re-elected to Parliament in a by-election as MP for St Mawes and was then elected as MP for Launceston at the 1713 general election. He changed his strategy with St George. He continued to secure offices related to public records for himself and he remained loyal to the Tory ministry in Parliament. With his influential political friends, Anstis was eventually able to obtain the promise of an appointment to the office of Garter King of Arms, on 2 April 1714.

Anstis was returned again as MP for Launceston in the 1715 general election and held the seat until the 1722. By the time that Sir Henry St George died in August 1715, the political situation had shifted away from Anstis's political connections: Vanbrugh was nominated to the office and took measures to secure the passage of his grant. In addition, on 30 September 1715 Anstis was arrested on suspicion of involvement in plotting a Jacobite uprising in Cornwall.

A protracted legal battle ensued as Anstis and Vanbrugh both claimed the title of Garter. Anstis eventually emerged victorious in May 1718. In 1724 he obtained an order for publishing, as editor and assisted by Elias Ashmole, the Register of the Most Noble Order of the Garter, From its Cover in Black Velvet Usually Called the "Black Book", which was printed at his own expense. This was a transcript of the Latin "Black Book of the Garter", the earliest surviving register of that order, written in about 1535, now in the Royal Collection at Windsor Castle. In the preface to his work he wrote:

While we, with sensible regret, complain of the loss of these old annals whereby we are deprived of a great treasure, it hath been judged expedient to preserve the remains which have happily escaped this shipwreck. And therefore the eldest register remaining in the archives is now exhibited to publick view, less by the currency of time or any unforeseen accident it might be subject to the same unhappy fate. The original manuscript is a very large pompous volume in folio written in an handsome strong character on vellom, having the initial letters of each paragraph, together with the names of the companions and of the knights nominated in scrutinies, beautifully embellished with gold, placed on squares of gold and azure alternately...It hath been shewn in the introduction when and by whom this register was compiled and from what materials it was collected.

In the following year he interested Robert Walpole in a plan for a new order of chivalry based on a revival of the medieval Order of the Bath. This led to his Observations Introductory to an Historical Essay on the Knighthood of the Bath in 1725 and to Anstis's drawing up the statutes for the new order.

It was, perhaps, Anstis's Toryism rather than any genuine failure in heraldic knowledge that led a prominent Whig nobleman (possibly Henry Herbert, 9th Earl of Pembroke or Philip Stanhope, 4th Earl of Chesterfield) to direct at him the memorable rebuke, "Thou silly fellow! Thou dost not know thy own silly business!"

Anstis duly presided over the coronation of George II in 1727. In 1728 he embarked on extensive research to prove that his family was related to Archbishop Henry Chichele, the founder of All Souls College, Oxford. This research could have entitled his son, John Anstis, to a fellowship at the college; which was blocked by Archbishop William Wake, Anstis did have his son made Blanc Coursier Herald in 1727. In 1737 he secured the succession of his office of Garter to John the younger.

Death and legacy
Anstis died on 4 March 1744 at Mortlake, Surrey. He was buried at Duloe in Cornwall on 23 March according to his wishes. Anstis was an indefatigable antiquarian whose correspondence with fellow scholars such as Thomas Hearne and Humfrey Wanley testifies to his wide interests. He left a mass of unpublished papers, including over 8,000 pages of notes on English history, Jurisprudence, Chronology, Heraldry, Ecclesiastical and Military Affairs. Many of his papers were sold in 1768 and in 1774 and are now held in the British Library, the Bodleian Library, and All Souls, Oxford.

Arms

References

Bibliography
John Anstis. The Register of the Most Noble Order of the Garter. (London, 1724).
Edward Cruickshanks. Anstis, John. Parliament Records (London, 1715–54).
Walter H. Godfrey and Sir Anthony Wagner, The College of Arms, Queen Victoria Street: being the sixteenth and final monograph of the London Survey Committee. (London, 1963).
Mark Noble, A History of the College of Arms. (London, 1805).
Sir Anthony Wagner. A Catalogue of English Mediaeval Rolls of Arms. Harleian Society (London, 1950).
Sir Anthony Wagner. Heralds of England: a History of the Office and College of Arms. (London, 1967).
Anthony Wagner and A. L. Rowse. John Anstis: Garter King of Arms (London, 1992).

External links
The College of Arms
Heraldic List of Officers of Arms

 

1669 births
1744 deaths
English antiquarians
17th-century antiquarians
18th-century antiquarians
English genealogists
Members of the Middle Temple
Members of the Parliament of England (pre-1707) for St Germans
Members of the Parliament of Great Britain for St Mawes
Members of the Parliament of Great Britain for Launceston
British MPs 1710–1713
British MPs 1713–1715
British MPs 1715–1722
English officers of arms
Writers from Cornwall
Cornish Jacobites
Alumni of Exeter College, Oxford
Burials in Cornwall
English MPs 1702–1705
Garter Principal Kings of Arms
Freemasons of the Premier Grand Lodge of England
17th-century English writers
17th-century English male writers
18th-century English writers
18th-century English male writers